D'Unbelievables are a comedy duo from Ireland formed in the late 1980s by Pat Shortt and Jon Kenny in Limerick. Together they created characters which could be seen on every street corner and pub in Ireland. They toured extensively all over Ireland for almost a decade until Jon Kenny was diagnosed with Hodgkin's Disease in 2000. He has recovered and can be now seen in gigs all over Ireland. Pat Shortt meanwhile launched his solo career in the late 90s and was the main force behind the success of the RTÉ comedy series Killinaskully.

In December 2005, three of their past shows, "D'Video", "D'Telly", and "D'Mother", were released on DVD for the first time. The DVD was entitled D'Collection.

On 3 December 2010, the D'Unbelievables officially reformed and performed on The Late Late Show. They reunited for a one-off nationwide tour from January to April 2011 titled 'One Hell Of A Do'!

Their performances and videos include
One Hell of a Video
D'Unbelievables
D'Video
D'Telly
D'Mother
D'Collection

Tours
2011 Ireland Tour - One Hell Of A Do!

Films
 The Closer You Get
 Angela Mooney Dies Again
 This Is My Father
 Saltwater
 Song of the Sea
 The Banshees of Inisherin

References

External links
 D'unbelievables DVDs
 Official site
 Facebook page

Irish comedy duos